Air Vice-Marshal Carl William Dixon,  is a retired senior commander of the Royal Air Force who served as Commander of Joint Helicopter Command from 2011 to 2014.

RAF career
Dixon was commissioned into the Royal Air Force (RAF) in 1979. As a junior officer he flew Chinook helicopters from RAF Germany. After an operational tour with the United Nations in Rwanda during the Rwandan genocide in 1994, he joined the Policy Staff at the Ministry of Defence. He became Commander of the Joint Support Helicopter Force in Bosnia and Herzegovina in 1997 and Officer Commanding No. 27 Squadron later that year. He led helicopter operations over Kosovo in 1999, was deployed to Sierra Leone in 2000 and then focussed on a scheme to develop joint helicopter capabilities with the Fleet Air Arm and Army Air Corps later that year.

Dixon joined the Air Resources & Plans Directorate at the Ministry of Defence in 2003 and then became Station Commander at RAF Benson from where he was deployed to Iraq as Commander of the UK Joint Helicopter Force. He became Director Equipment Capability (Air & Littoral Manoeuvre) in 2005, Director (Information Superiority) in 2008 and Commander of Joint Helicopter Command in 2011.

Dixon was appointed a Companion of the Order of the Bath in the 2010 Birthday Honours.

References

British military personnel of the Sierra Leone Civil War
Companions of the Order of the Bath
Living people
Officers of the Order of the British Empire
People from Hemel Hempstead
Royal Air Force air marshals
Royal Air Force personnel of the Iraq War
Year of birth missing (living people)